Sajad Gharibi (born 19 December 1991) is an Iranian bodybuilder and practitioner of mixed martial arts.

Early life 
Gharibi was born in Ahvaz, Iran. He received his Bachelor of Commerce degree from Azad University in Bushehr.

Career
Gharibi's nickname is "the Iranian Hulk" or "the Persian Hercules". He is 6 feet 2 inches tall and weighs 385 pounds.

UFC star Brian Ortega challenged Gharibi to appear in the MMA ring, and he accepted. Ortega said he would smash “the Iranian Hulk” despite weighing about 240 pounds less than Gharibi. Gharibi had already accepted a match against Britain's Martyn Ford, but the deal was cancelled. Gharibi stated that he had agreed to fight Brazilian bodybuilder or “the Brazilian Hulk” Romario dos Santos Alves. He mentioned in an Instagram post, "I’m finally accepting my first professional fight against a Brazilian fighter." He will fight Martyn Ford at an event set up by the Polish MMA organization Konfrontacja Sztuk Walki (KSW).

He offered to participate in the fight against ISIS in Syria in 2016. He said in a video, "I'm a defender of my country, first. I want to thank General Soleimani and all the soldiers who lost their lives in Syria. They are my heroes."

He has been offered roles in Iranian film and has accepted.

On July 31, 2022 during his boxing debut, Gharibi lost by TKO to "The Kazakh Titan" (Djumanov Almat Bakhytovich), two minutes into the opening round.

He lives in Bushehr.

References

External links

1991 births
Living people
Iranian bodybuilders
Iranian male mixed martial artists